Ramon John Hnatyshyn  (March 16, 1934December 18, 2002) was a Canadian lawyer and statesman who served as governor general of Canada, the 24th since Canadian Confederation.

Hnatyshyn was born and educated in Saskatchewan and served in the Royal Canadian Air Force prior to being elected to the House of Commons in 1974. On June 4, 1979, Hnatyshyn was sworn into the Queen's Privy Council for Canada and served as a minister of the Crown in two non-successive governments until 1988.

He was appointed governor general by Queen Elizabeth II in 1989, on the recommendation of Prime Minister Brian Mulroney. He replaced Jeanne Mathilde Sauvé as viceroy, and occupied the post until succeeded by Roméo LeBlanc in 1995. As the Queen's representative, Hnatyshyn proved to be a populist, reversing some exclusive policies of his predecessor, such as by opening up Rideau Hall to ordinary Canadians and tourists alike, and was praised for raising the stature of Ukrainian Canadians.

He subsequently practiced law and sat as Chancellor of Carleton University before dying of pancreatitis on December 18, 2002.

Early life and career
Hnatyshyn, a Ukrainian Canadian, was born in Saskatoon, Saskatchewan, to Helen and John Hnatyshyn. John practised as a lawyer, but also became involved in politics, running unsuccessfully in three federal elections in the riding of Yorkton before becoming Canada's first Ukrainian-born senator in 1959. John's political links and friendship with John Diefenbaker, the future prime minister, would provide his son with frequent exposure to high-calibre political debate.

Ray Hnatyshyn attended Victoria Public School and Nutana Collegiate Institute in Saskatoon, then went on to study at the University of Saskatchewan, earning a Bachelor of Arts in 1954, and a Bachelor of Laws two years later. He was called to the bar of Saskatchewan in 1957 and briefly worked at a Saskatoon law firm, then moved to Ottawa in 1958 to take a position as an assistant to Walter Aseltine, the Government Leader in the Canadian Senate.

Hnatyshyn returned to Saskatoon in 1960 and resumed his career as a lawyer. That year, on January 9, he married Karen Gerda Nygaard Andreasen, eventually having and raising two sons with her. In the 1964 Saskatchewan general election, he ran unsuccessfully as a Progressive Conservative Party of Saskatchewan candidate in the electoral district of Saskatoon City. In 1966 he began teaching at the University of Saskatchewan's College of Law as a sessional lecturer, and in 1973 he was appointed Queen's Counsel in Saskatchewan.

In his youth, Hnatyshyn enrolled in the Royal Canadian Air Cadets, where he was a member of 107 Spitfire Squadron in Saskatoon. He was enlisted as a reservist with the Royal Canadian Air Force (RCAF) from 1951 to 1956, then served in the RCAF's 23 Wing (Auxiliary) from 1956 to 1958.

Member of Parliament
In the 1974 federal election, Hnatyshyn ran as a Progressive Conservative Party (PC) candidate and won the riding of Saskatoon—Biggar, becoming a member of Parliament (MP). He was appointed the PCs' deputy house leader in 1976.

When Saskatoon—Biggar was abolished ahead of the 1979 election, Hnatyshyn followed most of his constituents into the newly established riding of Saskatoon West, where he won re-election. The PCs won a minority government in that election, and Hnatyshyn was appointed on June 4 to the Cabinet chaired by Joe Clark as Minister of Energy, Mines, and Resources, as well as Minister of State for Science and Technology.

The PC minority government fell in December 1979, and the Liberals regained power in the subsequent federal election held on February 18, 1980. Hnatyshyn was re-elected MP in Saskatoon West, and was named opposition critic for justice. Brian Mulroney replaced Joe Clark as PC leader following the 1983 leadership election, and named Hnatyshyn Opposition House Leader in April 1984.

The PCs won a landslide majority government in the 1984 federal election, and Hnatyshyn was named Government House Leader in November 1984, before adding President of the Privy Council to his portfolio in February 1985. By mid-1986, as the PCs began to trail the Liberals in opinion polling, Mulroney announced a cabinet shuffle, naming Hnatyshyn Minister of Justice and Attorney General of Canada on June 30. He was called to the bar of Ontario the same year, and was appointed Queen's Counsel in Canada in 1988.

Saskatoon West was abolished before the election of 1988, and Hnatyshyn attempted to follow most of his constituents into Saskatoon—Clark's Crossing, but lost to New Democratic Party challenger Chris Axworthy. Following his defeat, Hnatyshyn returned to practising law, joining the Ottawa firm of Gowling, Strathy & Henderson in April 1989.

Governor General of Canada

On December 14, 1989, Queen Elizabeth II, by commission under the royal sign-manual and Great Seal of Canada, appointed Prime Minister Brian Mulroney's choice of Hnatyshyn to succeed Jeanne Sauvé as the Queen's representative. He was the second consecutive Saskatchewan-born Governor-General. Hnatyshyn was sworn in during a ceremony in the Senate chamber on January 29, 1990.

Hnatyshyn thereafter made an effort to open up Rideau Hall—the monarch's and governor general's residence in Ottawa—to the public, establishing a visitors' centre and initiating guided tours of the palace and the royal park in which it sits. These moves marked a complete reversal of the policies of his predecessor Sauvé, who had closed Rideau Hall to the general public. In 1991, Hnatyshyn staged on the grounds the first of the annual Governor General's Summer Concert Series and, the year after, mounted His Excellency's Most Excellent Rock Concert and re-opened the skating rink to the public.

These events blended with some of Hnatyshyn's self-imposed mandates during his viceregal tenure, which included a desire to engage Canadian youth and focus attention on education and to encourage the arts. To these ends, he established in 1992 the Governor General's Performing Arts Award, the Ramon John Hnatyshyn Award for Voluntarism in the Arts, and the Governor General's Flight For Freedom Award for Lifetime Achievement in Literacy. Further, he founded the International Council for Canadian Studies, the Governor General Ramon John Hnatyshyn Education Fund, the Ramon John Hnatyshyn Award for Law, and the Governor General's International Award for Canadian Studies.

Among numerous other official and ceremonial duties, the Governor General presided over celebrations to mark the 125th anniversary of Confederation and welcomed to Rideau Hall the Prince and Princess of Wales, along with a host of foreign dignitaries such as President of Russia Boris Yeltsin and King Hussein and Queen Noor of Jordan. Further, Hnatyshyn undertook a number of state visits, including one to Ukraine, before his time serving at Her Majesty's pleasure ended on February 6, 1995.

Throughout his tenure as the Canadian viceroy, Hnatyshyn was both defended and criticised by the Monarchist League of Canada. In their final summary of Hnatyshyn's years in office, though, the former governor general was generally viewed to have not stood up for the Canadian Crown that he represented, choosing to follow, instead of Vincent Massey's example, that of Sauvé, who was herself seen as a republican. This lack of loyalty, it was argued, left Hnatyshyn with few defenders when he was targeted by members of the Reform Party for his salary and taxes. It was thought by John Pepall that Hnatyshyn's name had been selected by Mulroney to put forward to the Queen for appointment as governor general because Hnatyshyn, who had just recently been a member of the Cabinet headed by Mulroney until losing his parliamentary seat in the 1988 election, was someone Mulroney could "hardly feel any deference for", allowing Mulroney to continue to show the "juvenile extreme of the politician's craving for publicity and centre stage" he had while Jeanne Sauvé was governor general.

Post viceregal career and death

After his departure from Government House, Hnatyshyn returned to Gowling, Strathy & Henderson, where he became senior partner. In November 2002 he was installed as Chancellor of Carleton University in Ottawa; however, he died of complications from pancreatitis shortly before Christmas that year. Per tradition, and with the consent of his family, Hnatyshyn lay in state for two days in the Senate chamber. Though he was Ukrainian Orthodox, he was commemorated in his state funeral in a multi-faith ceremony on December 23, 2002, at Ottawa's Christ Church Cathedral. The service included the funeral rite of the Ukrainian Orthodox Church—officiated by Archbishop Yurij, Bishop of Toronto, and the clergy of the Ukrainian Orthodox Church—and a eulogy from the Canadian Broadcasting Corporation's chief correspondent, Peter Mansbridge. Adrienne Clarkson, by that time the sitting governor general, paid tribute to him via video, as she and her husband were en route to spend Christmas with Canadian troops stationed in the Persian Gulf. Hnatyshyn was then buried at Beechwood Cemetery in Ottawa.

Various memorials followed Hnatyshyn's death: On March 16, 2004, Canada Post unveiled at a ceremony, attended by Hnatyshyn's widow, a $0.49 postage stamp designed by Vancouver graphic artist Susan Mavor, and bearing the formal portrait of Hnatyshyn taken by Canadian Press photographer Paul Chaisson on the day Hnatyshyn became governor general, along with a tone-on-tone rendering of part of Hnatyshyn's coat of arms. Two years later, a 48-minute documentary DVD examining the life of Hnatyshyn, A Man for all Canadians was released in Canada by IKOR Film.

Honours and arms

Honours
Ribbon bars of Ray Hnatyshyn

Appointments
  1973 – December 18, 2002: Queen's Counsel for Saskatchewan (QC)
  September 30, 1974 – October 1, 1988: Member of Parliament (MP)
  June 4, 1979 – December 18, 2002: Member of the Queen's Privy Council for Canada (PC)
  1988 – December 18, 2002: Queen's Counsel for Canada (QC)
  1989 – December 18, 2002: Honorary Life Member of the Law Society of Saskatchewan
  January 10, 1990 – January 29, 1990: Companion of the Order of Canada (CC)
 January 29, 1990 – February 8, 1995: Chancellor and Principal Companion of the Order of Canada (CC)
 February 8, 1995 – December 18, 2002: Companion of the Order of Canada (CC)
  January 29, 1990 – February 8, 1995: Chancellor and Commander of the Order of Military Merit (CMM)
 February 8, 1995 – December 18, 2002: Commander of the Order of Military Merit (CMM)
  January 29, 1990 – February 8, 1995: Knight of Justice, Prior, and Chief Officer in Canada of the Most Venerable Order of the Hospital of Saint John of Jerusalem (KStJ)
 February 8, 1995 – December 18, 2002: Knight of Justice of the Most Venerable Order of the Hospital of Saint John of Jerusalem (KStJ)
  January 29, 1990 – February 8, 1995: Chief Scout of Canada
  1990 – December 18, 2002: Honorary Member of the Royal Military College of Canada Club
  1993 – December 18, 2002: Honorary Fellow of the Royal Heraldry Society of Canada (FRHSC)
 : Honorary Life Member of the Law Society of Upper Canada

Medals
  1977: Queen Elizabeth II Silver Jubilee Medal
  January 29, 1990: Canadian Forces Decoration (CD)
  1992: Commemorative Medal for the 125th Anniversary of the Confederation of Canada
  2002: Queen Elizabeth II Golden Jubilee Medal

Foreign honours
  1989: Ukrainian World Congress St. Volodymyr Medal
  1996: Hebrew University Mount Scopus Award

Honorary military appointments
  January 29, 1990 – February 8, 1995: Colonel of the Governor General's Horse Guards
  January 29, 1990 – February 8, 1995: Colonel of the Governor General's Foot Guards
  January 29, 1990 – February 8, 1995: Colonel of the Canadian Grenadier Guards

Honorary degrees
  May 23, 1990: University of Saskatchewan, Doctor of Laws (LLD)
  May 17, 1991: Royal Military College of Canada, Doctor of Laws (LLD)
  1991: Queen's University, Doctor of Laws (LLD)
  1991: University of Ottawa, Doctor of the University (DUniv)
  1991: British Columbia Open University, Doctor of Laws (LLD)
  1992: Carleton University, Doctor of Laws (LLD)
  June 15, 1992: McGill University, Doctor of Laws (LLD)
  October 23, 1992: University of Manitoba, Doctor of Laws (LLD)
  1993: Bishop's University, Doctor of Civil Law (DCL)
  October 29, 1994: Memorial University of Newfoundland, Doctor of Laws (LLD)
  1994: University of Alberta, Doctor of Laws (LLD)
  1994: University of Northern British Columbia, Doctor of Laws (LLD)
  1996: Law Society of Upper Canada at Osgoode Hall, Doctor of Laws (LLD)
 : University of Victoria, Doctor of Canon Law (JCD)
 : Royal Roads Military College, Doctor of Laws (LLD)
 : Yonsei University, Doctor of Philosophy (DPhil)
 : Chernivtsi University, Doctor of Laws (LLD)

Monuments
 : Statue, Saskatoon
 : Park and Monument,Sudbury

Honorific eponyms
Awards
 : Ramon John Hnatyshyn Cup
 : Ramon John Hnatyshyn Award for Law
 : Ramon John Hnatyshyn Award for Voluntarism in the Arts

Organisations
 : The Hnatyshyn Foundation
 : Ramon Hnatyshyn Canadian Studies Centre at Chernivtsi University

Arms

Archives 
There is a Ramon J. Hnatyshyn fonds at Library and Archives Canada.

Electoral record

Notes

References

External links

 Website of the Governor General of Canada entry for Ramon Hnatyshyn
 
 Canadian Broadcasting Corporation: installation of Ramon Hnatyshyn as governor general
 Canadian Broadcasting Corporation: obituary of Ramon Hnatyshyn

1934 births
2002 deaths
Politicians from Saskatoon
Canadian King's Counsel
Deaths from pancreatitis
Chancellors of Carleton University
Governors General of Canada
Attorneys General of Canada
Mining ministers of Canada
Members of the 21st Canadian Ministry
Members of the 24th Canadian Ministry
Members of the House of Commons of Canada from Saskatchewan
Members of the King's Privy Council for Canada
Commanders of the Order of Military Merit (Canada)
Companions of the Order of Canada
Knights of Justice of the Order of St John
Progressive Conservative Party of Canada MPs
Canadian people of Ukrainian descent
Chief Scouts of Canada
Lawyers in Ontario
Lawyers in Saskatchewan
University of Saskatchewan College of Law alumni
Burials at Beechwood Cemetery (Ottawa)